Walter Tso Tat-Wah (15 September 1915 – 10 January 2007) was a film actor of Hong Kong, most famous for the roles he played in a number of Wuxia films in the 1950s and 1960s.

The names Cho Tat-wah and Shih Kien were synonymous to "good and evil" in the colloquial language of Hong Kong because of the roles the two actors played in those movies. Yu So-chow co-starred many of Cho's movies. The two names Cho Tat-wah and Yu So-chow symbolized a perfect couple. His well-known roles include Lung Kim-fei, Leung Foon and Inspector Wah.

A native of Taishan, Guangdong, (Spoke Chinese Cantonese, and Chinese Taishenese) Cho began his actor career at the age of 15, and eventually starred in more than 700 movies. He was a compulsive gambler. Legend has it that he lost the Wah-tat Studio, which produced most of his movies at the time, at the gambling table. However, it is not certain whether the studio was owned by him.

Filmography

Films 
This is a partial list of films.
 1936 Tears of the Reed Catkins - Wong Tin-Wah
 1936 Luhua Lei
Xiangxiapo Congjun (1937)
Xihu nu (1937)
Modeng Wu Dalan (1937)
Kuang Dauyan (1937)
Bian fang xue lei (1937)
Roubo (1937)
Longcheng Feijian (1938)
Gong di (1938)
Xuejian Baoshan Cheng (1938)
Babai Zhuangshi (1938)
Shanghai Huoxian Hou (1938)
Sizi Congjun (1938)
Yan Ruisheng (1938)
Liu lang de fu qin (1938)
Chaimi Fuqi (1938)
Jinye Ju Xuji (1939)
Wuyi Dui (1939)
Sa nian ku ming nu (1939)
Toudu Hulang Guan (1940)
Little Guangdong (1940)
Xiao Guang Dong (1940)
Shi gui zai chu shi (1940)
Dayu Sha Jia (1940)
Chayi Hu (1940)
Zhao Zilong (1940)
Xiao Laohu (1941)
Zheng qi ge (1941)
Roar of the People (1941)
Molu Qier (1941)
Yongchun Sannian (1941)
Chu qiang hong xing (1941)
Xuegong Chunse (1941)
Gone Are the Swallows When the Willow Flowers Wilt (1946)
The Lady Escort, Part Two (1947)
Mou furen (1947)
Nu luo bin han (1947)
Qi jian shi san xia Shang ji (1949) - Chui Ming-Go
Qi jian shi san xia xia ji (1949)
Huang Fei-hong zhuan: Bian feng mie zhu (1949) - Leung Foon
Huang Fei Hong zhuan: Da po Ba Wang Zhuang (1949) - Leung Foon
Huang Fei Hong zhuan di san ji xue zhan Liu Hua Qiao (1949) - Leung Foon
Huang Fei Hong zhuan si ji: Liang Kuan gui tian (1950) - Leung Foon
Huo shao Shao Lin si (1950)
Ren hai wan hua tong (1950)
How Ten Heroes of Guangdong Slew the Dragon (1950) - Mak Tai
Lei dian zhui feng jian (1951)
Wu hu duan hun qiang (1951)
Hu dan ying hun (1952) - Fong Tat
Qi xia hei xuan feng (1952) - Black Whirlwind
Ye du Yuan Yang jiang (1953)
The Killing Spear (1953)
Ren tou qi an (1955) - Leung, Tai-yim
Liang Kuan yu Lin Shi Rong (1955) - Leung Foon
Xu Huang Fei Hong zhuan (1955) - Leung Foon
Huang Fei Hong hua di qiang pao (1955) - Leung Foon
Huang Fei Hong wen zhen si pai lou (1955) - Leung Foon
Huang Fei Hong chang ti jian ba (1955) - Leung Foon
Fang Shi Yu yu Hu Hui Qian (1955) - Woo Wai Kin
Huang Fei Hong da nao Fo Shan (1956) - Leung Foon
Huang Fei Hong du bei dou wu long (1956) - Leung Foon
Fang Shi Yu yi jiu Hong Xi Guan (1956) - Hung Hei-guan
Huang Fei Hong san xi nu biao shi (1956) - Leung Foon
Huang Fei Hong yi jiu long mu miao (1956) - Leung Foon
Huang Fei Hong nu tun shi er shi (1956) - Leung Foon
Huang Fei Hong fu er hu (1956) - Leung Foon
Huang Fei Hong xing shi hui qi lin (1956) - Leung Foon
Huang Fei Hong Shamian fu shen quan (1956) - Leung Foon
Huang Fei Hong heng sao Xiao Beijiang (1956) - Wan Tat Tat
Bu xia xiang wei zhui hun biao (1956)
Huang Fei Hong Guan Yin Shan xue hen (1956) - Leung Foon
Huang Fei Hong Guanshan da he shou (1956) - Leung Foon
Bai hao ying xiong chuan (1956)
Huang Fei-hong tian hou miao jin xiang (1956) - Leung Foon
Huang Fei Hong shui di san qin Su Shulian (1956) - Leung Foon
Huang Fei-hong qi dou huo qi lin (1956) - Leung Foon
Huang Fei Hong da nao hua deng (1956) - Leung Foon
Huang Fei-hong Henan yu xie zhan (1957)
Huang Fei Hong shi wang zheng ba (1957)
Huang Fei Hong die xie ma an shan (1957) - Leung Foon
Huang Fei Hong da po fei dao dang (1957) - Leung Foon
Heng ba qi sheng sheng zi qi (1957)
Huang Fei-hong ye tan hei long shan (1957) - Leung Foon
Huang Fei Hong wu du dou shuang long (1958) - Leung Foon
Huang Fei Hong long zheng hu dou (1958)
Huang Fei Hong da po jin zhong zhao (1958)
Huang Fei Hong da nao Feng Huang Gang (1958) - Leung Foon
Huang Fei Hong lei tai dou wu hu (1958) - Leung Foon
She diao ying xiong zhuan (1958)
Huang Fei Hong hu xue jiu Liang Kuan (1958) - Leung Foon
Sword of Blood and Valour (1958–1959) - Yuen Sing-chi
Liang Kuan's Fight at Fiery Tiger Pit (1958)
Huang Fei-hong Saved the Bride at Xiguan (1958)
Story of the Vulture Conqueror (1958–1959) - Kwok Ching
Huo zang Lan Tou He (1959) - Tang Lung
Huang Fei Hong bei kun hei di yu (1959) - Leung Foon
Huang Fei Hong hu peng fu hu (1959) - Leung Foon
Huang Fei Hong yi guan Cai hong qiao (1959) - Lau Cham
Huang Fei Hong lei tai zheng ba zhan (1960) - Leung Foon
Shisan hao xiong sha an (1960)
Xing xing wang da zhan Huang Fei Hong (1960) - Leung Foon
Huang Fei Hong yuan da po wu hu zhen (1961) - Leung Foon
Bu bu jing hun (1961) - Lee Hoi-Ming
Sha ren wang da zhan niu ji tan (1961)
Yi jian jiu lian huan (1961)
Zhui hun tai ji biao (1961)
Mo quan zhui xiong (1961) - Inspector Lui Tat
Kun lun qi jian dou wu long (1961)
Kun Lun san nu xia (1961) - Cha See Hung
Xiao Gan Luo bai xiang da jie ju (1962)
Ru yan jing hun (1962) - Woo Chi-Hung
Shuang jian meng (1962)
Shuang jian meng xia ji da jie ju (1962)
Nu du shou (1962) - Inspector To
Huang mao guai ren (1962) - Inspector To
Xian he shen zhen xin zhuan shang ji (1962)
Chain Murder (1962) - Yeung Sum
Huo shao gong lian si Shang ji (1963) - Gwai Mo
Huo shao gong lian si Xia ji (1963) - Gwai Mo
The Black Centipede (1963)
Gu rou en chou (1963) - Tse Jun-Wan
Zhui hun bai gu dao (1963)
Ye ban ren lang (1963)
Hong Xian Nu ye dao bao he (1963)
Lei dian tian xian jian (1963) - Ma Fei-Wan
Wan jian zhi wang (1963)
Yin jian jin dao (1964) - Ho Man-Kai / Ho Luk-Long
Ru lai shen zhang shang ji (1964) - Lung Kim Fai
Ru lai shen zhang xia ji da jie ju (1964) - Lung Kim Fai
Ru lai shen zhang san ji da jie ju (1964)
Ru lai shen zhang si ji da jie ju (1964)
Man tang ji qing (1964)
Qian shou shen quan shang ji (1965)
Qian shou shen quan xia ji (1965)
Gui gu shen nu (1965) - Lau Tin-Chi
Ru lai shen zhang nu sui Wan Jian Men (1965)
Te wu yi ling yi (1965)
Mi mi ke (1966)
Qi jian shi san xia (1967) - Chui Ming-Go
Kun Lun san sha shou (1967)
 1969 Supreme Sword - Fang Tien Hung. Also Producer. 
 1970 Secret Agent No. 1 - Inspector. Also as Director. 
 1970 The Young Girl Dares Not Homeward (aka Girl Wanders Around) - Inspector Tao. Dai heung lei bak min wai fung (1974)Hua hua gong zi (1974)Shen nu dang fu chuo tou wang (1975) - Chao Chen-tungThe Legend of the Condor Heroes (1976, TV Series) - Luk Sing-fungThe Return of the Condor Heroes (1976, TV Series) - Luk Sing-fungAvenging Warriors of Shaolin (1979) - Chun's TeacherHui feng hao huang jin da feng bao (1979)Za ji wang ming dui (1979) - Leung's FatherQi sha (1979) - Yang Chun YuCha chi nan fei (1980) - Chou Yi ShanWan ren zan (1980) - Liu Jing-TianShao Lin yu Wu Dang (1980) - Feng TeLong li ji (1980)A Deadly Secret (1980) - Wan ZhenshanTai Chi Master (1980, TV Series) - Buddhist Monk Hong-mingSi yiu (1981) - Chief inspector LiuGui ma zhi duo xing (1981) - Gang BossThe Duel of the Century (1981) - Monk KuguaDa qiao ying xiong zhuan (1981)My Young Auntie (1981) - Ching Fu, Iron Man of CantonAces Go Places (1982) - Uncle HuaCarry On Pickpocket (1982)Jut zai yau che (1982) - FarmerSan shi nian xi shuo cong tou (1982) - Gangster extraNan xiong nan di (1982)Nan xiong nan di (1982)Bat sap yee ga fong hak (1982) - Jealous husband Ru lai shen zhang (1982) - Tathagata2.5 CM (1982)Xiao sheng pa pa (1982)Bo jin (1982)Xiao zi you zhong (1982)Aces Go Places 2 (1983) - HuaJui gwai chat hung (1983) - Drunken HusbandTian ji guo he (1983)Shao ye Wei Wei (1983)Feng sheng shui qi (1983)Wu Song (1983)Winners and Sinners (1983) - Medicine ManMad Mission 3: Our Man from Bond Street (1984) - HuaHuang huo (1984)Zi jin xiong di (1984)A Friend from Inner Space (1984)Fan dau mui (1984) - PrincipalAi nu xin zhuan (1984) - Old Man in HouseDuo qing zhong (1984)My Lucky Stars (1985) - Supt. Walter TsaoGong xi fa cai (1985) - Police Supt.Ge wu sheng ping (1985)Juk nei ho wan (1985)Twinkle, Twinkle Lucky Stars (1985) - Supt. Walter TsaoMo cuo gu (1985)Aces Go Places 4 (1986) - HuaThe Millionaire's Express (1986) - Shanghai Chief InspectorHuan le ding dong (1986) - Captain Chan
 1986 The Family Strikes Back 1986 Lucky Stars Go Places - Supt. Walter Tsao
 1986 Mr. Vampire 2- Police Chief
 1988 Three Against the World - DetectiveFat lut mo ching (1988)Wu long zei ti shen (1988) - Supt. Walter TsoAces Go Places 5: The Terracotta Hit (1989) - Uncle WahFa da xian sheng (1989)Mang gwai dai ha (1989) - Buddhist GodHuo bao xing dong (1989)Return of the Lucky Stars (1989) - Supt. Walter TsoMeng gui zhuang gui (1989)Do si lip yan (1989) - Ma SirHuang jia fei feng (1989) - Joe TsoFunny Ghost (1989)The Iceman Cometh (1989) - Zheng's uncle instructorZhi ming de you huo (1990)Hu dan nu er hong (1990) - Yong's FatherMeng gui ba wang hua (1990) - Officer ChanBiao jie, ni hao ye! (1990) - Tzu's ex-comradeMa deng ru lai shen zhang (1990) - Master KooDemoness from Thousand Years (1990) - The Retard's FatherWu ye tian shi (1990) - Inspector Chao
 1994 It's a Wonderful Life - Dai-Foon Yum
 1996 How to Meet the Lucky Stars - Supt. Walter Tso
 2001 A Gambler's Story Television series 
 1985 The Legendary Prime Minister – Zhuge Liang (TV Series) - Pong Tak-gung
 1986 Rise of the Great Wall (TV Series) - King Chiu-seung
 1986 The Romance of the White Hair Maiden (TV Series) - Taoist Pak-shek

 Personal life 
In 1990, Tso emigrated to London, England, with his son. In 1993, Tso returned to Hong Kong to join TVB. In 1997, Tso returned to England as his wife was then suffering kidney disease. In 2000, Tso's wife died, he returned alone to Hong Kong. In August 2006, Tso was hospitalised for a month after falling down stairs at his home. In November 2006, Tso returned to England. Tso's son lives in England and his daughter lives in the United States. 

In January 2007 Tso died of haemorrhage of stomach in a hospital in London, England.

One of his goddaughters is Connie Chan.

ReferencesApple Daily'' , 16 January 2007

External links

 Walter Tso Tat-Wah at hkcinemamagic.com
 Walter Tso Tat-Wah at hkmdb.com
 Walter Tso Tat-Wah at lovehkfilm.com
 Walter Tso at senscritique.com
 Walter Tso at notrecinema.com
 Walter Tso at industrialhistoryhk.org

1915 births
2007 deaths
Hong Kong male film actors
Deaths from gastrointestinal hemorrhage
Hong Kong male television actors
People from Taishan, Guangdong
Male actors from Guangdong
20th-century Hong Kong male actors
21st-century Hong Kong male actors
Chinese male film actors
Chinese male television actors
20th-century Chinese male actors
21st-century Chinese male actors
Chinese emigrants to British Hong Kong